Mark Gordon (born 1957) is the 33rd governor of the U.S. state of Wyoming.

Mark Gordon may also refer to:
 Mark Gordon (producer) (born 1956), American television and film producer
The Mark Gordon Company, a film production company owned by the producer
 Mark Gordon (actor) (1926–2010), American film and television actor
 Mark Gordon (bridge), American bridge player
 Mark C. Gordon, first dean and president of the Mitchell Hamline School of Law
 Mark S. Gordon (born 1942), professor of chemistry at Iowa State University
 Mark Gordon, a character from the TV series Highway to Heaven

See also
 Marc Gordon (1935–2010), American record producer
 Gordon Mark, Canadian ice hockey player